Jung Won-Yong (also Jeong Won-Yong, ; born May 16, 1992 in Gyeonggi-do) is a South Korean swimmer, who specialized in freestyle and individual medley events. He won a bronze medal, as a member of the South Korean swimming team, in the 400 m freestyle relay at the 2010 Asian Games in Guangzhou, China.

Jung qualified for two swimming events at the 2012 Summer Olympics in London, by eclipsing FINA B-standard entry times of 2:02.50 (200 m individual medley) and 4:18.98 (400 m individual medley) from the FINA World Championships in Shanghai, China. In the 400 m individual medley, Jung challenged seven other swimmers on the second heat, including two-time Olympian Raphaël Stacchiotti of Luxembourg. He clinched a fifth spot and twenty-eighth overall by six hundredths of a second (0.06) behind Belarus' Yury Suvorau and Portugal's Diogo Carvalho, outside his entry time of 4:23.12. In his second event, 200 m individual medley, Jung edged out Ukrainian swimmer and double European junior champion Maksym Shemberev of Ukraine to claim a heat one victory by 0.07 of a second, with a time of 2:03.33. Jung failed to advance into the semifinals, as he placed thirty-second in the preliminary heats.

References

External links
NBC Olympics Profile

1992 births
Living people
South Korean male medley swimmers
Olympic swimmers of South Korea
Swimmers at the 2012 Summer Olympics
Asian Games medalists in swimming
Swimmers at the 2010 Asian Games
Swimmers at the 2014 Asian Games
South Korean male freestyle swimmers
Sportspeople from Gyeonggi Province
Asian Games bronze medalists for South Korea
Medalists at the 2010 Asian Games
21st-century South Korean people